Rhopalonema is a genus of deep-sea hydrozoans of the family Rhopalonematidae.

Species
There are two species:
 Rhopalonema funerarium Vanhöffen, 1902
 Rhopalonema velatum Gegenbaur, 1857

References

Rhopalonematidae
Hydrozoan genera